Yi Gwang may refer to:

Yi Gwang (general) (1541–1607), Joseon military general
Jeongye Daewongun (1785–1841), Joseon prince

See also
Li Gwang (born 1966), North Korean judoka